The house at 816 Jackson Street is a historic residence located in Thibodaux.

Background
Built in c.1895, the structure is a one-story frame cottage in Queen Anne Revival style with Stick–Eastlake details. Despite having been altered on the rear, the facade and much of side elevations are original.

The house was added to the National Register of Historic Places on July 22, 2009.

See also
 National Register of Historic Places listings in Lafourche Parish, Louisiana

References

Houses on the National Register of Historic Places in Louisiana
Queen Anne architecture in Louisiana
Stick-Eastlake architecture in Louisiana
Houses completed in 1895
Houses in Lafourche Parish, Louisiana
Thibodaux, Louisiana
National Register of Historic Places in Lafourche Parish, Louisiana